Rosen Barchovski (Bulgarian Cyrillic: Росен Барчовски) (born on 16 August 1960 in Sofia) is a former Bulgarian basketball player and current basketball head coach of Bulgaria national basketball team and CSKA Sofia.

He has coached Slavia Sofia, CSKA Sofia, Rilski Sportist and Bulgaria. 

As coach of Bulgaria, he qualified and lead the team to three European Championships 2005, 2011, 2022.

Barchovski is the son of Vanya Voinova and Tsvyatko Barchovski, who are distinguished Bulgarian basketball players.

References

1960 births
Living people
Basketball players from Sofia
Bulgarian men's basketball players